Argelos (Argelòs in Occitan) is a commune in the Pyrénées-Atlantiques department in the Nouvelle-Aquitaine region of south-western France. It is part of the urban area (aire d'attraction des villes) of Pau.

Geography

Argelos is located some 25 km north of Pau and 3 km west of Auriac. Access to the commune is by the D214 road from the village north to join the D944 road south-east of Thèze. The A65 autoroute passes through the northern tip of the commune but the nearest exit is Exit 9 near Miossens-Lanusse. The commune is mixed farmland and forest.

Located in the Drainage basin of the Adour, the Luy de France forms the north-eastern border of the commune as it flows north-west fed by its tributaries the Basta and the Balaing.

Places and Hamlets

 Barbé
 La Barthe
 Bordenave
 Boué
 Bourdalé
 Bozano
 Brouca
 Carrère
 Cassou
 Castagnet
 Chicoy
 Dibet
 Hargouette
 Hayet
 Labarrane
 Lamarque
 La Lane
 Larricq
 Lavignotte
 Lopou
 Loubané or Loubâne
 Morlaas
 Noble
 Poulou
 Sansarricq
 Tauhuré
 Then

Neighbouring communes and villages

Toponymy
The commune name in béarnais is Argelos. Brigitte Jobbé-Duval indicated that Argelos probably had a Latin origin of argilla (meaning "Clay") with the suffix -ossum. The meaning of the name would then be "clay soil".

The following table details the origins of the commune name and other names in the commune.

Sources:
Raymond: Topographic Dictionary of the Department of Basses-Pyrenees, 1863, on the page numbers indicated in the table. 
Cassini: Cassini Map from 1750

Origins:
Census: Census of Béarn

History
Paul Raymond noted on page 10 of his 1863 dictionary that in 1385 there were 29 fires in Argelos and it depended on the bailiwick of Pau. Auriac was formerly annexed to the commune.

The barony of Viven included Argelos, Auriac, and Viven and was a vassal of the Viscounts of Béarn.

Administration

List of Successive Mayors

Intercommunality 
Argelos is part of 4 inter-communal structures:
 the Communauté de communes des Luys en Béarn;
 the AEP association of the regions of Luy and Gabas;
 the Energy association of Pyrénées-Atlantiques ;
 the scholastic association Argelos - Astis.

Demography
In 2017 the commune had 282 inhabitants.

Culture and Heritage

Civil Heritage
The commune has several buildings and sites that are registered as historical monuments:
The Maison Marque Farmhouse (18th century)
A Farmhouse at Loubané (18th century)
The Maison Lavignotte-Lagrela Farmhouse at Lavignotte (18th century)
A Farmhouse at Lamarque (1725)
Houses and Farms (18th century)
A Fortified Complex at Lopou (Middle Ages)

Religious Heritage
The Parish Church of Saint-André (12th century) is registered as an historical monument. It contains many items which are registered as historical objects:

The Furniture in the Church
Two Dalmatics (18th century)
A Sunburst Monstrance (19th century)
4 altar Candlesticks (19th century)
2 banks of Pews (19th century)
A Confessional (18th century)
An Altar, Tabernacle, and Retable in the Altar of the Virgin (17th century)
2 Hanging Lighting Brackets (18th century)
A Painting: Christ on the Cross (1935)
2 Statues: Saints Pierre and André (18th century)
A Retable (18th century)
A Tabernacle (17th century)
An Altar with 2 banks of seating (17th century)
The whole main Altar

Education
Argelos has a primary school which is shared with Astis as an inter-communal educational grouping.

See also
Communes of the Pyrénées-Atlantiques department

References

External links
Community of communes of Luys en Béarn 
Argelos on the 1750 Cassini Map

Communes of Pyrénées-Atlantiques